Denise Del Vecchio Falótico (born 3 May 1954) is a Brazilian actress.

Career 

She began her career at age 15, at the Arena Theater in São Paulo in the early 1970s. She attended Vida e Morte Severina starring Cacilda Becker in her last performance, in 1969.

She studied Bertolt Brecht at the Auguste School, and soon afterwards decided to stage dialogues of the philosopher Plato with her philosophy class. Thereafter her interest in theater became fundamental. She studied with Emilio Fontana, in TBC, and after six months went to Teatro de Arena, where she became professional, interrupting its formation.

She appeared in Memórias da Lua, by Tuna Dwek, of the Aplauso Collection, of the Official Press of the State of São Paulo, which was released in February 2008.

Personal life 
Denise married actor Celso Frateschi with whom she performed in the theater and in the miniseries José do Egito. The couple has a son André Frateschi who is an actor, director and musician.

Filmography

Television

Films

Theater

References

External links 

1954 births
Living people
Actresses from São Paulo
Brazilian telenovela actresses
Brazilian film actresses
Brazilian stage actresses